Anderson Goose Lake or Goose Lake  or Anderson Lake are the names of a natural glacial lake located in Hamilton County, Iowa, close to Jewell Junction. It is an important waterfowl habitat. It is a National Natural Landmark designated in 1975.

References

Bodies of water of Hamilton County, Iowa
Lakes of Iowa
National Natural Landmarks in Iowa
Glacial lakes of the United States